New Millennium Sports, S.L., trading as Kelme, is a Spanish sports equipment manufacturing company that creates and produces sportswear and athletic shoes. It was founded in 1963 by Diego and José Quiles and its products are destined for the football, futsal, basketball, running, cricket and tennis markets.

Kelme is headquartered in Elche (Alicante), Spain, but has other offices worldwide including a United States Division in Conover, North Carolina.

Kelme sponsored a professional cycling team, together with the Valencian government.

Their products are endorsed by high-profile players such as David James, Josemi and Paul Kelly, and others. Their football boots are made to provide established power, swerve, accuracy and durability. Daniel González Güiza wears the Kelme Masters for RCD Mallorca. Real Madrid and RCD Mallorca used to wear kits produced by Kelme.

Sponsorships
Teams and athletes sponsored by Kelme worldwide are:

Cricket

National teams
 (Since December 2021)

Basketball

National teams

Club teams
  Dinamo Bucuresti
  Incheon ET Land Elephants
  Busan KT Sonicboom
  Neptūnas
  Hapoel Holon

Football

Football Federations
 AFC

National teams
  (From March 2023)

Non FIFA national teams
Associations Teams and athletes sponsored:

Non representative national teams

National leagues

  China League One
  China League Two

Referees
Kelme is also the official referee kits supplier for the leagues:

  Jordanian Pro League

Club teams

Volleyball

National teams

Club teams
  Al Ahly

Futsal
Associations Teams and athletes sponsored:

  Liga Nacional de Fútbol Sala (Since the 2013/2014 season)
  Ju Delgado
  Benicarló F.S.
  Caja Segovia FS
  Elche CF
  Sofía Rodriguez
  Lorena Rubio
  Laura Fernández
  Patricia Chamorro
  Arturo Santamaría
  Dani Salgado
  FC Litija
  Oplast Kobarid
  Al Hilal

Esport
Associations Teams

  Koi Squad

Roller hockey
Clubs

  Hockey Club San Jorge

See also
Kelme (cycling team)

References

External links

 

Sport in the Valencian Community
Sportswear brands
Sporting goods manufacturers of Spain
Clothing companies established in 1977
Companies based in the Valencian Community
Spanish brands
Elche
1977 establishments in Spain